Château Wagenbourg is a castle in the commune of Soultzmatt, in the department of Haut-Rhin, Alsace, France. It has been a listed historical monument since 1987.

References

Castles in Haut-Rhin
Monuments historiques of Haut-Rhin